Alejandro Siqueiros Quiroz (born October 28, 1982) is a male freestyle swimmer from Mexico. He represented his native country at the 2003 Pan American Games and the 2004 Summer Olympics.

References

1982 births
Living people
Mexican male swimmers
Sportspeople from Hermosillo
Mexican male freestyle swimmers
Swimmers at the 2004 Summer Olympics
Swimmers at the 2003 Pan American Games
Olympic swimmers of Mexico
Central American and Caribbean Games gold medalists for Mexico
Competitors at the 2002 Central American and Caribbean Games
Competitors at the 2006 Central American and Caribbean Games
Central American and Caribbean Games medalists in swimming
Pan American Games competitors for Mexico
21st-century Mexican people